Rodolfo Othello Cruz Ilustre, Jr. (born October 10, 1987), known professionally as Rodjun Cruz, is a Filipino actor, dancer and singer. He is the brother of fellow actor and dancer Rayver Cruz.

Biography
Cruz started as a host, together with his younger brother Rayver, in the children's magazine show 5 And Up. Cruz was a member of the now defunct all-male dancing group Anim-E. The group, previously named Anime—in reference to the Tagalog word "anim" or "six"—originally consisted six members namely: Rayver Cruz, John Wayne Sace, Emman Abeleda, Sergio Garcia, Mico Aytona, and Mhyco Aquino. Rodjun joined the original members in 2005.

In 2006, he was cast as Jigo in the ABS-CBN TV series Calla Lily.

After a year, Cruz along with 14 other celebrity contestants joined the second season of U Can Dance Version 2, where he met and started dating fellow Star Magic talent Dianne Medina. Cruz with his dancing partner Lina Basas were named Grand Champion of U Can Dance Version 2 the following year, where he won the grand prize of 250,000 pesos. He also won another 250,000 pesos from the "Merrygalo" segment of, the now defunct noontime variety show, Wowowee. He made a guest appearance in the "Mambabarang" episode of Komiks Presents: Pedro Penduko at ang mga Engkantao in the same year.

In 2008, Cruz was cast as Jake Perez in the teen drama Lipgloss.

Cruz left Lipgloss after three seasons in 2009.  He had minor roles in the ABS-CBN shows Tayong Dalawa and May Bukas Pa. He also made guest appearances in Maynila and Midnight DJ.

He played Calvin in Magkaribal in 2010. He was also cast as Joaquin Buenaventura in Juanita Banana. The same year, he left ASAP XV and joined, the show's rival, P.O.5 in TV5.

Personal life
Cruz is a cousin of entertainers Sheryl Cruz, Sunshine Cruz, Geneva Cruz and Donna Cruz.

In October 2017, Cruz announced his engagement to actress Dianne Medina after dating since July 23, 2007. The couple married on December 21, 2019. In April 2020, they announced that they were expecting their first child together.

Filmography

Television

Awards and nominations

References

External links 

 
 https://www.gmanetwork.com/sparkle/artists/rodjuncruz

1987 births
Living people
21st-century Filipino male actors
Filipino male television actors
Filipino people of Spanish descent
Reality show winners
Participants in Philippine reality television series
Star Magic
ABS-CBN personalities
GMA Network personalities
Rodjun
People from Las Piñas
Male actors from Manila